Allgemeiner means general in the German language. It may refer to:

A synonym for Furmint grapes
Allgemeiner Arbeiterverband der Freien Stadt Danzig, a former trade union
Allgemeiner Deutscher Arbeiterverein, a political party
 (ADAC), a German car club
Allgemeiner Deutscher Fahrrad-Club, a German cycling group 
Allgemeiner Deutscher Musikverein, a music association 
Allgemeiner Deutscher Nachrichtendienst, a German state news agency
 (AStA), a German students' union

See also
Frankfurter Allgemeine Zeitung, German newspaper
Allgemeine Deutsche Biographie
Allgemeine SS
Abitur exam